Talas is a town in northwestern Kyrgyzstan, located in the Talas river valley between two mountain ranges. It is the administrative headquarters of Talas Region. The town was founded by East Slavic settlers in 1877. To the south is the Besh-Tash (‘five rocks’) valley with the Besh-Tash National Park.The Historic Battle of Talas was also fought here between the armies of the Abbasid Caliphate and the Tang Dynasty in 751. The Abbasids defeated the Chinese Empire.

Overview
Its economy has traditionally been oriented towards the ancient city of Taraz (formerly named Talas and Dzhambul) in present day Kazakhstan. The Talas valley has suffered severely from the imposition of rigid border controls by Kazakhstan following the demise of the Soviet Union, as transport and trade links to the rest of Kyrgyzstan are now constrained by the mountains separating it from the Chüy Valley and Bishkek. Though much transportation does occur from Bishkek to Talas by transiting through Kazakhstan via the border crossings at Chaldybar in Chüy and then re-crossing into the Talas valley of Kyrgyzstan at Taraz.  The only drivable road within the borders of Kyrgyzstan to Bishkek and the rest of the country crosses two mountain passes that rise to heights of more than 3000 meters above sea level over the Ötmök Pass into the Suusamyr Valley and then again the Töö Ashuu Pass before descending to the Chüy Valley and Bishkek.

Population

Climate
Talas has a warm, dry-summer continental climate (Köppen climate classification Dsb).

Manas

Manas, the mythical Kyrgyz national hero, is said to have been born in the Ala Too mountains in Talas oblast. A few kilometres outside Talas lies a mausoleum, supposedly that of Manas, called the Kümböz Manas. However, the inscription on its richly decorated facade dedicates it to "...the most glorious of women Kenizek-Khatun, the daughter of the Emir Abuka". Legend explains that Manas' wife Kanikey ordered a deliberately false inscription in order to mislead her husband's enemies and prevent the desecration of his body. The building, known as Manastin Khumbuzu or The Ghumbez of Manas, is thought to have been built in 1334. It now contains a museum dedicated to the epic. A ceremonial mound also lies nearby.

Sports
The town has a bandy club.
FC Namys-APK, football club

Notable people 

 Gulsaira Momunova

References

Bibliography 
Kyzlasov I.L., "Runic Scripts of Eurasian Steppes", Moscow, Eastern Literature, 1994,

External links

Talasmost.kg: A new web site for former Talas residents and anyone interested in the city (in Russian)
The web site of the citizen radio Radiomost in Talas (in Russian)

Populated places in Talas Region
Populated places established in 1877
1877 establishments in the Russian Empire